Gassman is a surname. Notable people with the surname include:

Alessandro Gassman (born 1965), Italian actor
David Gassman (born 1949), American politician
Tedd Gassman (born 1943), American politician
Vittorio Gassman (1922–2000), Italian theatre and film actor and director

See also
Gassman indole synthesis, indole forming reaction
Gasman (disambiguation)

Jewish surnames
Germanic-language surnames